The Sheraton Grand Doha Resort & Convention Hotel is a five-star luxury hotel run by the Sheraton Hotels and Resorts overlooking the Persian Gulf in the West Bay area of Doha, Qatar. Located approximately two miles northwest of the port area, it reportedly covers an area of around 10,000 square metres. The hotel reportedly cost around $100 million to build, and although built by an American company, it was subsidized by the Qatari government.

Established in 1979, it is noted for its distinct pyramid shape and is part of the conference facility for the Organization of Arab States. The Sheraton Doha has been described as having "a world of Arabian luxury and magical ambience". The hotel itself has a very important function as a conference centre in Doha and regularly hosts events including international scientific seminars and meetings. The First Conference for Expatriate Arab Scientists, QFIRST took place at the hotel in 2007 and it has hosted meetings of the World Trade Organization (WTO). The hotel reportedly has one auditorium which holds over 1000 people.

The hotel has 371 rooms, 9 restaurants, and 26 conference rooms. In 2020, it was host to the Doha peace conference that negotiated the withdrawal of U.S. troops from Afghanistan.

References

External links
Official site

Buildings and structures in Doha
Hotels in Qatar
Sheraton hotels
Hotels established in 1979
Hotel buildings completed in 1979
Pyramids in Asia
1979 establishments in Qatar